Nadine Smith is an LGBT activist and has been the executive director of Equality Florida since its inception in 1997 and serves as a legislative lobbyist, living in Tallahassee during session. In 1986, Smith served on the founding board of the International Gay and Lesbian Organization. Smith has been recognized as a national leader by organizations including: National Gay and Lesbian Task Force, Human Rights Campaign, Human Rights Task Force of Florida, National Center for Lesbian Rights (NCLR) and the National Black Lesbian and Gay Leadership Forum.

A former journalist, Smith has written syndicated columns for various gay and mainstream publications. Smith was an award-winning investigative journalist for WUSF, the National Public Radio affiliate in Tampa, and later became a reporter for the Tampa Tribune. Smith also freelanced for national and local publications.

In 1991, Smith was the first openly lesbian African-American to run for Tampa City Council, earning the most votes in the primary and garnering 42% in the run-off.

In 1993, Smith was part of the historic oval office meeting between then-incumbent President of the United States Bill Clinton and LGBT social movements leaders. Smith was co-chair of the 1993 March on Washington, coordinating national and international media. She also served four terms as co-chair of the Federation of Statewide LGBT Advocacy Organizations.

Smith attended the U.S. Air Force Academy after graduating High School in Panama City. She left after the passage of Don't Ask Don't Tell in 1993. She earned a Mass Communication degree from the University of South Florida.

In 1995, Smith served as campaign manager for Citizens for a Fair Tampa, a successful effort to prevent the repeal of the city’s human rights ordinance, which included sexual orientation.

Smith has been an outspoken advocate for anti-hate crimes and anti-bullying legislation. In 2008, Equality Florida's efforts resulted in the passage of a statewide anti-bullying law that has spurred school districts across the state to include sexual orientation and gender identity in their anti-bullying and anti-harassment policies.

From 2006 - 2009, Smith served on the Board for Fairness for All Families, a grassroots effort to protect LGBT families in the face of a ballot measure that banned recognition of marriage between same sex couples. The measure which passed with approx 62% of the vote also banned protection that are "substantial equivalent of marriage".

In 2007, Smith was arrested at a Largo City Council hearing after handing someone a flier that had the words "Don't Discriminate" printed on it. The Council was debating whether or not to fire Susan Stanton, the city manager who had transitioned from male to female. The charges were later dropped. The Police Chief and the City Council issued official apologies.

In 2010 Smith brought Florida's anti-gay adoption law that bans any gay person from adopting to the attention of President Obama. During a White House event, she presented the President with a picture of two boys the state of Florida is trying to block from being adopted by the gay man who has been their foster father for more than 5 years.

Smith has served as a spokesperson for Equality Florida denouncing the adoption ban, in particular challenging the state for using huge sums of taxpayer dollars to fund a discredited anti-gay activist as their star witness.

Quotes 

 "George W. Bush and Al Gore shouldn't be talking about who's going to blink first. They should be talking about how are we going to restore faith in democracy in the American people, because it's been sorely tested right now."
 "They don't ask, we don't tell and rarely are they required to see with their own eyes the deep harm and real pain inflicted by laws that tell us we are less than our neighbors."
 "When fair-minded Floridians come to understand just how harmful this initiative is to so many Florida families, they will reject this amendment. Laws should not make it harder to take care of the people you love."
 "As a child I was told that Rosa Parks was tired and fed up one fateful day and decided right then and there that she would not give up her seat. I was impressed by her courage. Later, when I learned that her protest had been contemplated at length with the consequences fully measured, I was inspired even more deeply by her willingness to intentionally sacrifice her freedom and safety to make the country confront the ugliness of Jim Crow."
 "We march, we lobby, we educate, we protest and we should and we must. But it seems increasingly clear to me that we must now do what civil rights movements have always done: with forethought and solemnity place ourselves visibly at odds with an unjust law to provoke the consequences that can prick the conscience of our country."
 "Every civil rights struggle in this country has required people to sacrifice and make institutionalized discrimination so visible no one could avert their eyes. People stepped forward knowing they could lose their homes, lose their jobs, their safety. They walked willingly toward hateful mobs and police with snarling dogs. They turned a proposed one day bus boycott into 381 days of solidarity. They sacrificed and the country watched and changed. Every civil rights struggle in this country has required people to sacrifice. The country is watching. Are we ready to do the same?"

References

External links 
 Equality Florida
 IGLYO
 Smith Gives Letter to President Obama
 Black LGBT history
 Marriage Debate Florida
 Mayor makes inroads
 No Excuses? Do We Really Mean It

African-American activists
Activists from Florida
African-American women journalists
African-American journalists
Journalists from Florida
American lesbians
LGBT African Americans
American LGBT journalists
LGBT people from Florida
American LGBT rights activists
Lesbian journalists
Living people
Year of birth missing (living people)
20th-century African-American women
21st-century American women
Women civil rights activists
21st-century African-American women